Bengt Forsberg (born 1952) is a Swedish concert pianist most famous for his numerous collaborations with the mezzo-soprano Anne Sofie von Otter. He participated in her project to record songs written in the concentration camp of Terezín. Forsberg has a reputation as a champion of neglected music and composers. He is highly acclaimed as a recital accompanist and regularly plays alongside Mats Lidström and Nils-Erik Sparf.

After graduating from the Gothenburg School of Music and Musicology, Forsberg was trained by Peter Feuchtwanger and Herman David Koppel.

References

External links
Bengt Forsberg on bach-cantatas
Entries for recordings by Bengt Forsberg on WorldCat

1952 births
Living people
Swedish classical pianists
Male classical pianists
Date of birth missing (living people)
21st-century classical pianists
21st-century Swedish male musicians